Hope High School  is an educational institution that was established in 2000 in Kabul, Afghanistan.

References

2000 establishments in Afghanistan
Educational institutions established in 2000
Schools in Kabul